Ab Bid-e Alibaz (also Romanized as Āb Bīd-e ‘Alībāz; also known as Āb Bīd, Āb Bīd ‘Alī, and Āb-ī-Bīd) is a village in Kiyaras Rural District, in the Central District of Gotvand County, Khuzestan Province, Iran. At the 2006 census, its population was 280, in 49 families.

References 

Populated places in Gotvand County